Denmark is an unincorporated community in Morrow County, in the U.S. state of Ohio.

History
Denmark once had a post office called Merritt, named for the Merritt family who were the first settlers there. A post office was established under the name Marits in 1833, and remained in operation until 1907. Besides the post office, Denmark once contained a church and country store.

References

Unincorporated communities in Morrow County, Ohio
1833 establishments in Ohio
Populated places established in 1833
Unincorporated communities in Ohio